Yoeri Havik (born 19 February 1991 in Zaandam) is a Dutch cyclist, who currently rides for UCI Continental team .

Major results

Road

2008
 1st Omloop der Vlaamse Gewesten
 8th Grand Prix Bati-Metallo
2009
 5th Omloop Mandel-Leie-Schelde Juniors
 5th Remouchamps–Ferrières–Remouchamps
2010
 6th Dwars door het Hageland
 7th Antwerpse Havenpijl
 9th Nationale Sluitingsprijs
2011
 4th Nationale Sluitingsprijs
 4th Dutch Food Valley Classic
 4th Ronde van Noord-Holland
 5th Münsterland Giro
 5th Omloop der Kempen
 5th Dorpenomloop Rucphen
 6th ZLM Tour
 8th Schaal Sels
 10th Ronde van Vlaanderen U23
2012
 1st Stage 4 Tour de Normandie
 3rd Omloop der Kempen
 4th Antwerpse Havenpijl
 5th Omloop van het Waasland
 6th Trofeo Migjorn
2013
 1st ZLM Tour
 1st Himmerland Rundt
 3rd Grote 1-MeiPrijs
 4th Skive–Løbet
 6th Ronde van Noord-Holland
 8th La Côte Picarde
 8th Riga Grand Prix
 9th Trofeo Palma
 9th Trofeo Migjorn
2014
 1st Antwerpse Havenpijl
 4th Zuid Oost Drenthe Classic I
 6th Ronde van Midden-Nederland
 7th De Kustpijl
 9th Kampioenschap van Vlaanderen
 10th Omloop van het Houtland
 10th Trofeo Palma
2015
 3rd Fyen Rundt
 4th Ronde van Overijssel
 7th Arno Wallaard Memorial
 7th Ronde van Noord-Holland
 10th GP Horsens
2016
 3rd ZODC Zuidenveld Tour
2018
 4th PWZ Zuidenveld Tour
 4th Grote Prijs Jean-Pierre Monseré
 9th Gooikse Pijl
 10th Kampioenschap van Vlaanderen
2019
 3rd Midden–Brabant Poort Omloop
 9th De Kustpijl

Track

2007
 National Junior Championships
2nd Points race
2nd Madison
2nd Individual pursuit
2008
 National Junior Championships
1st  Points race
1st  Madison
2nd Individual pursuit
2009
 3rd Madison (with Barry Markus), National Championships
2010
 2nd Madison (with Barry Markus), National Championships
2011
 1st Six Days of Tilburg (with Nick Stöpler)
 2nd Madison (with Niki Terpstra), National Championships
 3rd  Madison (with Nick Stöpler), UEC European Under-23 Championships
 3rd Six Days of Amsterdam (with Nick Stöpler)
2012
 3rd Six Days of Rotterdam (with Danny Stam)
2013
 National Championships
1st  Scratch
1st  Derny
 3rd Six Days of Rotterdam (with Nick Stöpler)
2014
 National Championships
1st  Madison (with Dylan van Baarle)
1st  Derny
 1st Six Days of Amsterdam (with Niki Terpstra)
2015
 1st  Madison (with Dylan van Baarle), National Championships
2016
 3rd Six Days of Berlin (with Nick Stöpler)
 3rd Six Days of Rotterdam (with Niki Terpstra)
2017
 National Championships
1st  Points race
1st  Madison (with Wim Stroetinga)
 1st Six Days of Berlin (with Wim Stroetinga)
 3rd Six Days of Bremen (with Jesper Mørkøv)
 3rd Six Days of Copenhagen (with Wim Stroetinga)
 3rd Six Days of Ghent (with Wim Stroetinga)
2018
 1st  Madison (with Wim Stroetinga), National Championships
 1st Six Days of London (with Wim Stroetinga)
 1st Six Days of Berlin (with Wim Stroetinga)
 2nd Six Days of Bremen (with Achim Burkart)
 2nd Six Days of Copenhagen (with Moreno De Pauw)
 2nd Six Days of Rotterdam (with Wim Stroetinga)
2019
 National Championships
1st  Points race
1st  Madison (with Wim Stroetinga)
 2nd  Madison (with Jan-Willem van Schip), UEC European Championships
 2nd  Madison (with Jan-Willem van Schip), European Games
 2nd Madison (with Roy Pieters), UCI World Cup, Cambridge
 3rd Six Days of Copenhagen (with Matias Malmberg)
 3rd Six Days of London (with Wim Stroetinga)
 3rd Six Days of Rotterdam (with Wim Stroetinga)
2020
 1st Madison (with Jan-Willem van Schip), UCI World Cup, Milton
 1st Six Days of Rotterdam (with Wim Stroetinga)
 3rd Six Days of Fiorenzuola (with Jan-Willem van Schip)
2021
 1st  Madison (with Jan-Willem van Schip), UEC European Championships
 National Championships
1st  Elimination
1st  Madison (with Cees Bol)
1st  Points race
1st  Scratch
2022
 1st  Points race, UCI World Championships
 UCI Nations Cup
1st Madison (with Jan-Willem van Schip), Milton
2nd Elimination, Glasgow
2nd Elimination, Milton
 2nd Six Days of Rotterdam (with Niki Terpstra)

References

External links

1991 births
Living people
Dutch male cyclists
Sportspeople from Zaanstad
Cyclists at the 2019 European Games
European Games medalists in cycling
European Games silver medalists for the Netherlands
Olympic cyclists of the Netherlands
Cyclists at the 2020 Summer Olympics
Dutch track cyclists
Cyclists from North Holland
20th-century Dutch people
21st-century Dutch people
UCI Track Cycling World Champions (men)